Justine Joyce (born 14 March 1974) is an Australian former representative rower. She is national champion and a world champion and is the standing world record holder in the women's lightweight coxless pair.

Club and state rowing
Joyce's senior rowing was done from three Melbourne clubs - Hawthorn, Yarra Yarra  and the Banks Rowing Club. She was a sweep oared rower in the days when national and world championship lightweight titles for women's fours were contested in sweep oared boats.

Joyce raced in Victorian representative women's crews who contested the Victoria Cup at the Interstate Regatta. Till 1998 that race was in lightweight coxless four and Joyce raced in Victorian fours in 1996, 1997 and 1998. She stroked those crews to victory in 1997 and 1998  In 1999 she was selected in the Victorian women's heavyweight eight to contest the ULVA Trophy. She was in the two seat for the 1999 Victorian win.

International representative rowing
Joyce made her Australian representative debut in a lightweight coxless pair at the 1996 World Rowing Championships, a lightweight only regatta in Strathclyde, Scotland. She raced with her Victorian team-mate Eliza Blair to a fifth place.

The following year at Aiguebelette 1997 paired with Joyce, Blair won World Championship gold in a lightweight coxless pair. As a result of the women's lightweight coxless pair being retired from international racing in 1997, Joyce's 7:18:32 time set with Blair is the standing world's best time in that event.

References 

 

1974 births
Living people
Australian female rowers
World Rowing Championships medalists for Australia
20th-century Australian women